Robert G. Cassilly (born July 1958) is an American politician who is currently the county executive of Harford County, Maryland. He previously served in the Maryland State Senate from 2015 to 2022, representing District 34.

Early life
Robert G. Cassilly was born in July 1958, in Havre de Grace, Maryland. He attended Bel Air High School.

Cassilly attended the Johns Hopkins University where he was a member of the ROTC program. He graduated in 1980 with a Bachelor of Arts in international relations. He graduated from the University of Baltimore School of Law in 1988 with a Juris Doctor. While attending law school, he served as law clerk to the Honorable Dana M. Levitz of the Circuit Court for Baltimore County.

Career

Military career
In 1976, Cassilly enlisted in the Maryland Army National Guard and served with the 20th Special Forces Group until 1978. He was an ROTC cadet at the Johns Hopkins University, from 1976 to 1980, graduating in 1980 as an ROTC Distinguished Military Graduate. He was then commissioned as a Regular Army officer in the United States Army. He graduated with honors from the Army Airborne School and from the Army Ranger School. He served as an active duty Infantry officer from 1980-1985 when he transferred to the Army Reserves. As a member of the U.S. Army Reserves, he served as a JAG with the 10th Legal Support Organization and as an International Law Officer with the 352nd Civil Affairs Command. In 2006, he deployed to Iraq with the 352nd and was assigned to the 101st AB Division. He was awarded the Bronze Star, State Department Meritorious Honor Award, Iraq Campaign Medal, and National Defense Service Medal for his service in Salah ad Din Province, Iraq.

Law career
After graduating from law school with honors, he served as a law clerk to the Maryland Court of Special Appeals. From 1989 until 1995 he practiced law in Baltimore, initially with the firm of Irwin, Kerr, Green, McDonald and Dexter and then Law Office of William A. McDaniel. He opened his own law practice in Bel Air, Maryland in 1997 and practiced there until 2006 when was deployed to Iraq with the U.S. Army. Upon his return from Iraq, he served as an adviser and trainer at the Army National Training Center in California.

From December 2007 until August 2013, Cassilly was employed by the United States State Department as a Senior Adviser in the Bureau of Near Eastern Affairs, Senior Strategic Planner in U.S. Embassy, Baghdad, Iraq, Acting Director of Stability Operations at the Foreign Service Institute in Arlington, Virginia, as senior governance adviser in Karbala Province, Iraq, and as senior adviser to the Bureau of Conflict Stabilization Operations, in Washington, D.C. He was awarded the State Department Superior Honor Award and Expeditionary Award for service in Iraq. In 2013 he returned to the practice of law as a litigator in Maryland state and federal courts.

Political career
Cassilly served as a member and chairman of the Harford County Republican Central Committee from 1990 to 1996. From 1997 to 2002 he served as a councilman and then Mayor of his hometown of Bel Air, Maryland. He stepped down from the town council in 2002 to run for a position on the Harford County Council. Cassilly won election to the Harford County Council as the representative from district C, which includes the town of Bel Air and the area around the town. He served in this capacity until being deployed to Iraq as a member of the Army Reserves in January 2006.

In 2014 Cassilly was a candidate for Maryland Legislative District 34 in the Maryland Senate, which had been vacated by former Senate Minority Leader Nancy Jacobs. He ran unopposed in the Republican primary and went on to defeat his democrat challenge by 14 points in the general election. At the same time his younger brother Andrew, was elected as a State Delegate in district 35B and his older brother, Joseph, won re-election as Harford County State's Attorney. Both Bob and Andrew were re-elected in the 2018. Joseph retired in 2017 after having served as 34 years as Harford County State's Attorney 

From 2015 to 2022, Cassilly served as the Maryland State Senator for District 34, in Harford County. He was a member of the Judicial Proceedings Committee; Joint Committee on Federal Relations; Joint Committee on Administrative, Executive and Legislative Review; Maryland State Commission on Criminal Sentencing Policy; Court of Appeals Standing Committee on Rules of Practice and Procedure; and Veterans Caucus. He resigned in December 2022 to serve as county executive of Harford County.

Personal life
Cassilly is married and has five children.

References

External links

Living people
1958 births
People from Havre de Grace, Maryland
Johns Hopkins University alumni
Maryland lawyers
Republican Party Maryland state senators
United States Army soldiers
United States Army personnel of the Iraq War
United States Department of State officials
University of Baltimore School of Law alumni
21st-century American politicians
Harford County Executives